Masoud Bakheet (born 5 January 1992) is a Saudi Arabian professional footballer who plays as a right back for Al-Riyadh.

Club career
Bakheet started his career with Hetten coming through the youth ranks before being promoted to the first team. On June 25, 2015, Bakheet joined Al-Nahda. He spent a year at the club before signing for Al-Hazem. With Al-Hazem, he helped the club achieve promotion to the Pro League. On 13 January 2022, Bakheet joined Ohod. On 16 June 2022, Bakheet joined Al-Riyadh.

Honours
Al-Hazem
MS League: 2020–21, runner-up 2017–18

References

External links
 

Living people
1992 births
Saudi Arabian footballers
Association football defenders
Hetten FC players
Al-Nahda Club (Saudi Arabia) players
Al-Hazem F.C. players
Ohod Club players
Al-Riyadh SC players
Saudi First Division League players
Saudi Professional League players